Portrait of Pope Sixtus IV is a  portrait in oils of Pope Sixtus IV by Titian and his studio.

Provenance 
The painting was recorded as being at the Ducal Palace of Urbino in 1568, before moving from there to Florence in 1631 as part of the dowry of Vittoria Della Rovere on her marriage to Ferdinand II, Grand Duke of Tuscany. It moved to the Palazzo Pitti in 1694 as one of the works owned by Francesco Maria de' Medici. It finally moved to the Uffizi in 1897. In June 1940 it and other works from the Uffizi were moved to a wartime refuge at the Villa medicea di Poggio a Caiano. Between 1944 and 1951 it returned to the Palazzo Pitti, followed by a long period in the Uffizi's stores. It was re-exhibited at the Uffizi from 1972 onwards.

Sources
Wethey, Harold E. The Paintings of Titian. London: Phaidon, 1966–1975, vol. II, n. 97.

Sixtus IV
1540 paintings
Paintings in the collection of the Uffizi
Pope Sixtus IV
Pope Sixtus IV